Hidehisa (written: 秀久) is a masculine Japanese given name. Notable people with the name include:

, Japanese politician
, Japanese samurai

Japanese masculine given names